In general relativity, a lambdavacuum solution is an exact solution to the Einstein field equation in which the only term in the stress–energy tensor is a cosmological constant term.  This can be interpreted physically as a kind of classical approximation to a nonzero vacuum energy. These are discussed here as distinct from the vacuum solutions in which the cosmological constant is vanishing. 

Terminological note: this article concerns a standard concept, but there is apparently no standard term to denote this concept, so we have attempted to supply one for the benefit of Wikipedia.

Definition

The Einstein field equation is often written as

with a so-called cosmological constant term . However, it is possible to move this term to the right hand side and absorb it into the stress–energy tensor , so that the cosmological constant term becomes just another contribution to the stress–energy tensor. When other contributions to that tensor vanish, the result

is a lambdavacuum. An equivalent formulation in terms of the Ricci tensor is

Physical interpretation

A nonzero cosmological constant term can be interpreted in terms of a nonzero vacuum energy.  There are two cases:
: positive vacuum energy density and negative isotropic vacuum pressure, as in de Sitter space,
: negative vacuum energy density and positive isotropic vacuum pressure, as in anti-de Sitter space.
The idea of the vacuum having a nonvanishing energy density might seem counterintuitive, but this does make sense in quantum field theory.  Indeed, nonzero vacuum energies can even be experimentally verified in the Casimir effect.

Einstein tensor

The components of a tensor computed with respect to a frame field rather than the coordinate basis are often called physical components, because these are the components which can (in principle) be measured by an observer. A frame consists of four unit vector fields

Remarkably, in the case of lambdavacuum, all observers measure the same energy density and the same (isotropic) pressure.  That is, the Einstein tensor takes the form

Saying that this tensor takes the same form for all observers is the same as saying that the isotropy group of a lambdavacuum is SO(1,3), the full Lorentz group.

Eigenvalues

The characteristic polynomial of the Einstein tensor of a lambdavacuum must have the form

Using Newton's identities, this condition can be re-expressed in terms of the traces of the powers of the Einstein tensor as

where

are the traces of the powers of the linear operator corresponding to the Einstein tensor, which has second rank.

Relation with Einstein manifolds

The definition of a lambdavacuum solution makes sense mathematically irrespective of any physical interpretation, and lambdavacuums are a special case of a concept that is studied by pure mathematicians.

Einstein manifolds are pseudo-Riemannian manifolds in which the Ricci tensor is proportional to the metric tensor.  The Lorentzian manifolds that are also Einstein manifolds are precisely the lambdavacuum solutions.

Examples

Noteworthy individual examples of lambdavacuum solutions include:
de Sitter space, often referred to as the dS cosmological model,
anti-de Sitter space, often referred to as the AdS cosmological model,
de Sitter–Schwarzschild metric, which models a spherically symmetric massive object immersed in a de Sitter universe (and likewise for AdS),
Kerr–de Sitter metric, the rotating generalization of the latter,
Nariai spacetime; this is the only solution in general relativity, other than the Bertotti–Robinson electrovacuum, that has a Cartesian product structure.

See also

Exact solutions in general relativity

Exact solutions in general relativity